Hans Eugster (27 March 1929 – 12 November 1956) was a Swiss gymnast and Olympic Champion.

Biography
He competed at the 1952 Summer Olympics in Helsinki, where he received a gold medal in  parallel bars, a silver medal in team combined exercises, and a bronze medal in rings.

References

External links

1929 births
1956 deaths
Swiss male artistic gymnasts
Gymnasts at the 1952 Summer Olympics
Olympic gymnasts of Switzerland
Olympic gold medalists for Switzerland
Olympic medalists in gymnastics
Medalists at the 1952 Summer Olympics
Olympic silver medalists for Switzerland
Olympic bronze medalists for Switzerland
20th-century Swiss people